Komarevo may refer to:

 In Bulgaria (written in Cyrillic as Комарево):
 Komarevo, Montana Province - a village in Berkovitsa municipality, Montana Province
 Komarevo, Pleven Province - a village in Dolna Mitropoliya Municipality, Pleven Province
 Komarevo, Varna Province - a village in Provadiya Municipality, Varna Province
 Komarevo, Vratsa Province - a village in Byala Slatina municipality, Vratsa Province
 Donje Komarevo, a village near Sisak, Croatia
 Gornje Komarevo, a village near Sisak, Croatia